The 1965 Eastern Illinois Panthers football team represented Eastern Illinois University as a member of the Interstate Intercollegiate Athletic Conference (IIAC) during the 1965 NCAA College Division football season. The team was led by first-year head coach Clyde Biggers and played their home games at Lincoln Field in Charleston, Illinois. The Panthers finished the season with a 3–5 record overall and a 1–3 record in conference play.

Schedule

References

Eastern Illinois
Eastern Illinois Panthers football seasons
Eastern Illinois Panthers football